Federal Route 230, or Jalan Kuantan - Cherok Paloh (formerly Pahang State Route C17), is a federal road in Pahang, Malaysia. The Kilometre Zero of the Federal Route 230 starts at Kampung Kuala Baharu junctions.

Features

At most sections, the Federal Route 183 was built under the JKR R5 road standard, with a speed limit of 90 km/h.

List of junctions

References

Malaysian Federal Roads
Roads in Pahang